Planetes is a genus of beetles in the family Carabidae, containing the following species:

 Planetes angusticollis Baehr, 1986 
 Planetes australis (W.J. Macleay, 1871) 
 Planetes bimaculatus W.S. Macleay, 1825
 Planetes bipartitus Basilewsky, 1963 
 Planetes congobelgicus Basilewsky, 1963 
 Planetes cordens Darlington, 1968 
 Planetes elegans (Nietner, 1857) 
 Planetes formosanus Jedlicka, 1939
 Planetes gerardi Borgeon, 1937 
 Planetes humeralis Darlington, 1968 
 Planetes indicus Andrewes, 1922 
 Planetes kasaharai Habu, 1978
 Planetes limbatus Peringuey, 1896 
 Planetes lineolatus Putzeys, 1880 
 Planetes magelae Baehr, 1986 
 Planetes millstreamensis Baehr, 1986 
 Planetes minimus Jedlicka, 1936 
 Planetes muiri Andrewes, 1924 
 Planetes multicostulatus Basilewsky, 1954 
 Planetes obiensis Louwerens, 1956 
 Planetes pendleburyi Andrewes, 1929 
 Planetes puncticeps Andrewes, 1919
 Planetes quadricollis Chaudoir, 1878 
 Planetes ruficeps Schaum, 1863 
 Planetes ruficollis (Nietner, 1857) 
 Planetes secernendus Oberthur, 1883 
 Planetes simplex Bates, 1886

References

Dryptinae